Eslamabad (also Romanized as Eslāmābād) is a village in Kushk Rural District, Abezhdan District, Andika County, Khuzestan Province, Iran. At the 2006 census, its population was 1,950, in 370 families.

References 

Populated places in Andika County